2016 World Ice Hockey Championships may refer to:

 2016 Men's World Ice Hockey Championships
 2016 Women's Ice Hockey World Championships
 2016 World Junior Ice Hockey Championships
 2016 IIHF World U18 Championships